Pitcairnia integrifolia is a plant species in the genus Pitcairnia. This species is native to Venezuela, Brazil and Trinidad & Tobago.

References

integrifolia
Flora of Venezuela
Flora of Brazil
Flora of Trinidad and Tobago
Plants described in 1812
Flora without expected TNC conservation status